Charles Ellsworth Grapewin (December 20, 1869 – February 2, 1956) was an American vaudeville and circus performer, a writer, and a stage and film actor. He worked in over 100 motion pictures during the silent and sound eras, most notably portraying Uncle Henry in Metro-Goldwyn-Mayer's The Wizard of Oz (1939), "Grandpa" William James Joad in The Grapes of Wrath (1940), Jeeter Lester in Tobacco Road (1941), Uncle Salters in Captains Courageous  (1937), Gramp Maple in The Petrified Forest (1936), Wang's Father in The Good Earth (1937), and California Joe in They Died With Their Boots On (1941).

Biography
Born in Xenia, Ohio, Charles Grapewin ran away from home to be a circus acrobat which led him to work as an aerialist and trapeze artist in a traveling circus before turning to acting. He traveled all over the world with the famous P. T. Barnum circus. Grapewin also appeared in the original 1903 Broadway production of The Wizard of Oz, 36 years before he would be featured in the famous Metro-Goldwyn-Mayer film version.

After this he continued in theatre, on and offstage, for the next thirty years, starting with various stock companies, and wrote stage plays as a vehicle for himself. His sole Broadway theatre credit was the short-lived play It's Up to You John Henry in 1905.

Grapewin began in silent films at the turn of the twentieth century. His very first films were two "moving image shorts" made by Frederick S. Armitage and released in November 1900; Chimmie Hicks at the Races (also known as Above the Limit) and Chimmie Hicks and the Rum Omelet, both shot in September and October 1900 and released in November of that year. During his long career, Grapewin appeared in more than one hundred films, including The Good Earth, The Petrified Forest, The Grapes of Wrath, Tobacco Road, and in what is probably his best-remembered role: Uncle Henry in The Wizard of Oz. Prior to being cast in that film, Grapewin performed in Metro-Goldwyn-Mayer's Broadway Melody of 1938 with Judy Garland (Dorothy in Oz) and Buddy Ebsen (the original Tin Man in Oz). He also performed with Garland in Listen, Darling. Later, in the early 1940s, he had a recurring role as Inspector Queen in the Ellery Queen film series.

Personal life and death
Grapewin married actress Anna Chance in 1896, and they remained together until her death in 1943. Two years later, on January 10, 1945, he married Loretta McGowan Becker.

Grapewin died on February 2, 1956, at his home in Corona, California at the age of 86. His ashes are interred with his wife's in Forest Lawn Memorial Park Cemetery in Glendale, California, at the Great Mausoleum's Columbarium of Inspiration.

Selected filmography

 The Shannons of Broadway (1929) as Swanzey (film debut)
 Only Saps Work (1930) as Simeon Tanner
 The Millionaire (1931) as Ed Powers
 Gold Dust Gertie (1931) as Nicholas Hautrey
 Heaven on Earth (1931) as Doc Boax
 Hell's House (1932) as Henry Clark
 The Big Timer (1932) as Pop Baldwin
 Disorderly Conduct (1932) as Limpy
 Are You Listening? (1932) as Pierce (uncredited)
 Huddle (1932) as Doctor (uncredited)
 The Woman in Room 13 (1932) as Andy
 The Washington Masquerade (1932) as Senator Simmons (uncredited)
 Lady and Gent (1932) as Grocer
 American Madness (1932) as Mr. Jones (uncredited)
 The Night of June 13 (1932) as "Grandpop" Jeptha Strawn
 Wild Horse Mesa (1932) as Sam Bass
 No Man of Her Own (1932) as George, the Clerk
 Hello, Everybody! (1933) as Jed
 The Kiss Before the Mirror (1933) as Schultz
 Heroes for Sale (1933) as Pa Dennis
 Midnight Mary (1933) as Clerk
 Don't Bet on Love (1933) as Pop McCaffery
 Pilgrimage (1933) as Dad Saunders
 Turn Back the Clock (1933) as Dr. Henderson (uncredited)
 Beauty for Sale (1933) as Freddy Gordon
 Torch Singer (1933) as Judson
 Wild Boys of the Road (1933) as Mr. Cadman (uncredited)
 Female (1933) as Drunk at Hamburger Stand (uncredited)
 Hell and High Water (1933) as Peck Wealin
 Two Alone (1934) as Sandy Roberts
 Caravan (1934) as Notary
 The Quitter (1934) as Ed Tilford
 She Made Her Bed (1934) as Joe Olesen
 The Loudspeaker (1934) as Pop Calloway
 Return of the Terror (1934) as Jessup
 Judge Priest (1934) as Sergeant Jimmy Bagby
 The President Vanishes (1934) as Richard Norton
 Anne of Green Gables (1934) as Dr. Tatum
 In Spite of Danger (1935) as Pop Sullivan
 Eight Bells (1935) as Grayson
 Party Wire (1935) as Will Oliver
 One Frightened Night (1935) as Jasper Whyte
 Shanghai (1935) as Truesdale
 Alice Adams (1935) as J. A. Lamb
 King Solomon of Broadway (1935) as Uncle Winchester
 Rendezvous (1935) as Martin
 Super-Speed (1935) as Terry Devlin
 Ah, Wilderness! (1935) as Dave McComber
 The Petrified Forest (1936) as Gramp Maple
 The Voice of Bugle Ann (1936) as Cal Royster
 Small Town Girl (1936) as Dr. Ned Fabre
 Libeled Lady (1936) as Mr. Bane
 Without Orders (1936) as J.P. Kendrick
 Sinner Take All (1936) as Aaron
 The Good Earth (1937) as Old Father
 A Family Affair (1937) as Frank Redmond
 Captains Courageous (1937) as Uncle Salters
 Between Two Women (1937) as Dr. Webster
 Broadway Melody of 1938 (1937) as James K. Blakeley
 Bad Guy (1937) as Dan Gray
 Big City (1937) as The Mayor
 The Bad Man of Brimstone (1937) as Barney Lane
 Of Human Hearts (1938) as Jim Meeker
 The Girl of the Golden West (1938) as Uncle Davy
 Three Comrades (1938) as Local Doctor
 Three Loves Has Nancy (1938) as Grandpa Briggs
 Listen, Darling (1938) as Uncle Joe
 Artists and Models Abroad (1938) as James Harper
 Stand Up and Fight (1939) as 'Old Puff'
 Burn 'Em Up O'Connor (1939) as 'Doc' Heath
 Sudden Money (1939) as Grandpa Casey Patterson
 The Man Who Dared (1939)  as Ulysses Porterfield
 The Wizard of Oz (1939) as Uncle Henry
 Dust Be My Destiny (1939) as Pop
 Hero for a Day (1939) as Uncle Frank 'Lucky' Higgins
 Sabotage (1939) as Major Matt Grayson
 The Grapes of Wrath (1940) as William James "Grandpa" Joad
 Johnny Apollo (1940) as Judge Emmett T. Brennan
 Earthbound (1940) as Mr. Whimser
 Rhythm on the River (1940) as Uncle Caleb
 Ellery Queen, Master Detective (1940) as Insp. Queen
 Texas Rangers Ride Again  (1940) as Ranger Ben Caldwalder
 Tobacco Road (1941) as Jeeter
 Ellery Queen's Penthouse Mystery (1941) as Inspector Richard Queen
 Ellery Queen and the Perfect Crime (1941) as Insp. Queen
 Ellery Queen and the Murder Ring (1941) as Insp. Queen
 They Died with Their Boots On (1941) as California Joe
 A Close Call for Ellery Queen (1942) as Inspector Queen
 A Desperate Chance for Ellery Queen (1942) as Insp. Queen
 Enemy Agents Meet Ellery Queen (1942) as Inspector Richard Queen
 Crash Dive (1943) as Pop (uncredited)
 Follow the Boys (1944) as Nick West
 Atlantic City (1944) as Jake Taylor
 The Impatient Years (1944) as Benjamin L. Pidgeon, Bellboy
 Gunfighters (1947) as Inskip - Rancher
 The Enchanted Valley (1948) as Grandpa
 Sand (1949) as Doug
 When I Grow Up (1951) as Grandpa Reed (final film role)

References

External links

 

1869 births
1956 deaths
Acrobats
Vaudeville performers
American male film actors
American male silent film actors
American male stage actors
People from Xenia, Ohio
People from Corona, California
19th-century American male actors
20th-century American male actors
Male actors from Ohio
Burials at Forest Lawn Memorial Park (Glendale)
Ringling Bros. and Barnum & Bailey Circus people
Articles containing video clips
Metro-Goldwyn-Mayer contract players